Mercer railway station in Mercer, New Zealand, is 72 km from Auckland and 609 km from Wellington on the North Island Main Trunk line. It opened on 20 May 1875 and was closed to passengers about 1970 and to goods in the 1990s. It burnt down in 1879 and also in 1900. Until 1958 it was the first refreshment stop south of Auckland.

History
The line was extended to Mercer on 20 May 1875, though the pioneer British contractors, John Brogden & Sons, ran an excursion train the day before. The New Zealand Herald said, "This will be a busy station for some time to come, it being the terminus." It described the route as crossing Mangatawhiri swamp, then running beside the South Road, with a short branch line being constructed to connect with the Waikato Steam Navigation Company's boats. It said the station and other buildings were still being built. 'Some time to come' ended just over 2 years later, when the line was extended to Ngāruawāhia on 13 August 1877. The refreshment room was built in 1876/77 for £245 and extended in 1878/79 for £180.

The service began with two trains per day each way between Auckland and Mercer taking 2hrs 50mins. The station was unfinished when the railway opened.

An 1880 advert for reopening of the refreshment rooms said trains waited 20 minutes.

In 1902 the newly rebuilt station was described as, "a long wood and iron building, which contains a large refreshment room and bar, ladies' room, public room, booking office, stationmaster's room, and post and telegraph department. There is also a large engine shed, besides a pump house and coal shed, and there are eight cottages in the immediate vicinity", with 9 staff – stationmaster, porter, cadet, 2 engine drivers, 2 firemen, and 2 greasers.

Until New Zealand Railways took over in 1917, the "refreshment rooms" were managed by the Mercer Railway Hotel, opposite the station. The hotel was rebuilt in 1898, with 15 bedrooms, 3 sitting rooms and a 50-seat dining room. The refreshment rooms gained importance when dining cars on main trunk expresses were removed as a wartime measure.

The refreshment rooms became the target of poet A.R.D Fairburn's witty tongue with this very famous quip.

"The thought occurs to those who are entrained:
The squalid tea of Mercer is not strained."

Traffic grew to a peak in World War 2, as shown in the graph and table below.

Accidents and tunnel
An engine cleaner died in 1899 after trying to jump onto a moving engine.

A Wellington to Auckland "Limited" express derailed on 28 October 1940 killing the driver and fireman and injuring 12 passengers. An estimate put the speed at 75 mph (though some at the inquiry gave evidence of normal speed) on the  8-chain radius curve, just south of the station, near the former  tunnel opened out in 1937. The engine, K900, tipped on its side and was overrun by six carriages. The curve has been greatly eased in the 2006 Mercer to Long Swamp Expressway 4-laning of 12 km of SH1, which included this 1 km of rail deviation.

Another derailment at Mercer was on 3 September 2013, when a freight train blocked both the road and railway.

Future services
In 2011 a feasibility report on reinstating passenger services said a station with a platform 155m long and 750mm high for 6-car trains would cost $4m. The proposal was shelved. It is believed by some that the figure is overly inflated to kill off the proposal. Today, the Te Huia Hamilton - Papakura services passes Mercer but does not stop.

Mainline Steam depot 
Heritage operator Mainline Steam Heritage Trust is developing a new depot at Mercer. By June 2020 three of their locomotives were stored in a siding at Mercer.

References

External links
Photos
view from above tunnel
1900s view from above tunnel
about 1900 J Class locomotive and tunnel
stationmaster on a jigger about 1902
1907 flood (New Zealand Graphic NZG-19070126-10c-1)
1936 photos of old tunnel, tunnel removal and construction tramway
1950s
1952 photo of track doubling work
1968 aerial
from north and from south 1972 aerial
aerial view of 4-laned SH1 and realigned railway
Map
large scale map showing station, tunnel, wharf branch and 1940 crash site
Timetables
 1876, 1877, 1879, 1880, Feb 1882, Mar 1882, Sep 1882, Jan 1883, Mar 1883
 Appeal by porter against military service in 1918

Defunct railway stations in New Zealand
Waikato District
Rail transport in Waikato
Buildings and structures in Waikato